Abies hickelii is a species of conifer in the family Pinaceae.

It is endemic to Mexico, found only in Chiapas, Guerrero, Oaxaca, Puebla, Veracruz states.

References

hickelii
Endemic flora of Mexico
Flora of Chiapas
Flora of Guerrero
Flora of Oaxaca
Flora of Puebla
Flora of Veracruz
Taxonomy articles created by Polbot